The Life of a Jackeroo is a 1912 Australian silent film directed by Franklyn Barrett. It is considered a lost film.

Plot
A young Englishman (Tom Middleton) leaves his actress girlfriend (Ruth Wainwright) to seek an experience in Australia. He works as a jackeroo on a property and falls in love with the daughter (Tien Hogue) of a wealthy squatter.  They are happy until the actress arrives and joins forces with an evil overseer.  They persuade some local aborigines to raid the squatter's home and capture the Englishman.  The squatter's daughter rides to the rescue and a loyal aboriginal helps saves the day.

Cast
Tom Middleton as the Englishman
Tien Hogue as the squatter's daughter
Ruth Wainwright as the actress

Production
The film was made immediately after A Blue Gum Romance using the same locations, much of the same cast and some of the same incidents.

Screenings were often accompanied by a lecturer.

Reception
The film was popular at the local box office and screened in England and the USA.

References

External links

The Life of a Jackerook at National Film and Sound Archive

1913 films
Australian drama films
Australian silent films
Australian black-and-white films
Lost Australian films
1913 drama films
Lost drama films
Films directed by Franklyn Barrett
Silent drama films
1910s English-language films
English-language drama films